Rudi Hirsch (20 November 1931 - 27 November 2021) was a German handballer, who competed for the SC Dynamo Berlin / Sportvereinigung (SV) Dynamo. He played at the world championships 1958 (3rd), 1959 (world champion), 1963 (world champion) and 1964.

References

1931 births
2021 deaths
German male handball players
Sportspeople from Halle (Saale)